The Kposo or Akposso people are an ethnic group living in the Plateau Region of southern Togo, west of Atakpamé, and across the border in Ghana. Their ethnic language is Kposo or Ikposo.

Economy

Akposso farmers grow cocoa and coffee as cash crops. Traditional crops include yams, maize "(ɖzukklɔ)"and fonio.

Culture

The traditional Akposso calendar has five days in each week. These are Imle, Ekpe, Ewle, Eyla, and Eva.

Fonio is culturally important. An annual festival called "Ovazu" is held around harvest time, and in Togo it is held together with the Akebus.

References

External links
Akpɔssɔ Français English Utsyi Ʋli
Ethnologue report on Ikposo/Akposo

Ethnic groups in Togo